Thayagam is a 1996 Indian Tamil language action film directed by A. R. Ramesh. The film stars Vijayakanth, Arun Pandian and Napoleon. It was released on 15 January 1996. Vijayakanth won Tamil Nadu State Film Award Special Prize for this film.

Plot

Three death row prisoners escape from the jail and hijack a plane where Abdul Salim (Laxmi Rattan), a scientist, owns a miracle drug. The pilot (Napoleon), instead of listening to the hijackers' instruction, manages to land in the Kashmir mountain. There, Snobir (Mansoor Ali Khan), a sadistic terrorist leader threatens the passengers for recovering the drugs. The pilot and the national boxing champion Pailwan (Arun Pandian) plan to save the passengers and try to escape but they are caught during the plan taken as prisoners. Both attack and kill many terrorists; everyone escapes with them everything goes smoothly until an ambush occurs on a bridge so the brave Pailwan sacrifices himself to save the pilot and the passengers.

Elsewhere, the short-tempered Sakthivel (Vijayakanth) who is a family friend of Abdul Salim, and Abdul Salim's daughter Shakeela (Ranjitha) plan to save everyone so they find their crashed plane and they enter as prisoners. Sakthivel also lies that he is the scientist and tells the terrorist head to release everyone. The film ends with Sakthivel single-handedly killing all the terrorists and saving the day.

Cast

Vijayakanth as Sakthivel
Arun Pandian as Pailwan
Napoleon as Pilot
Ranjitha as Shakeela
Mohini as Abirami
Mansoor Ali Khan as Snobir (Snow Bear)
Laxmi Rattan as Abdul Salim
Kazan Khan as Sunil, a traitor
Peeli Sivam as Sakthivel's father
Thyagu as a hostage
Vivek as a hostage
Balu Anand as a hostage
Kaviyasri as Sarasu, a hostage
Vijay Eswaran
Sakthivel as a traitor
Peter Yang as a hostage
Kamalesh as a hostage
Vaithi
Mohan Raman
Baby Jennifer as Angela
Kalyan in a special appearance

Awards
The film has won the following awards since its release :

Tamil Nadu State Film Awards 1996 

Tamil Nadu State Film Special Award for Best Actor - Vijayakanth
Tamil Nadu State Film Award for Best Lyricist - Piraisoodan

Soundtrack

The film score and the soundtrack were composed by Deva. The soundtrack, released in 1996, features 5 tracks with lyrics written by Piraisoodan.

References

1996 films
1990s Tamil-language films
Films set in Jammu and Kashmir
Indian Army in films
Films set on airplanes
Kashmir conflict in films
Films about terrorism in India
Films directed by A. R. Ramesh